The Division of New England is an Australian electoral division in the state of New South Wales.

History

The division was proclaimed in 1900, and was one of the original 65 divisions to be contested at the first federal election. It is named after the New England region in northern New South Wales.

From 1922 to 2001, New England was usually regarded as a comfortably safe seat for the National Party, formerly the Country Party. Only one Labor candidate has ever won the seat – Frank Foster at the 1906 election and again at the 1910 election, both times on small margins. Since then, the closest Labor has come to winning the seat was in the 1943 landslide, when the Country majority was pared back to an extremely marginal 1.1 percent. It was a marginal seat for most of the 1980s, but since the 1990s Labor has been lucky to get 40 percent of the two-party vote, and has frequently been pushed into third place.

The seat's best-known member was Ian Sinclair, leader of the National Party from 1984 to 1989, a minister in the Menzies, Holt, McEwen, Gorton, McMahon and Fraser governments and Speaker of the Australian House of Representatives for a few months in 1998. He was succeeded by Stuart St. Clair in the 1998 election.

St. Clair was then defeated in the 2001 by independent Tony Windsor, who held it until his retirement in 2013.

The member since the 2013 federal election has been former Queensland Senator Barnaby Joyce, who served as Deputy Prime Minister of Australia and leader of the National Party from 2016 to 2018. Amid the 2017–18 Australian parliamentary eligibility crisis, the seat was declared vacant on 27 October 2017 by the High Court of Australia arising from Joyce's dual citizenship. Joyce had renounced his dual citizenship effective from August to become a sole citizen of Australia and was thus eligible to run for federal parliament. Joyce regained the seat at a by-election on 2 December.

Boundaries
Since 1984, federal electoral division boundaries in Australia have been determined at redistributions by a redistribution committee appointed by the Australian Electoral Commission. Redistributions occur for the boundaries of divisions in a particular state, and they occur every seven years, or sooner if a state's representation entitlement changes or when divisions of a state are malapportioned.

The division is located in the north-east of New South Wales, adjoining the border with Queensland. The 66,394 km² division covers a largely rural area, with agriculture the main industry. From south to north it includes the regional population centres of Scone, Tamworth, Armidale, Glen Innes, Inverell and Tenterfield.

Under the original redistribution proposal in 2015, the Australian Electoral Commission announced it intended to abolish Hunter. Electors in the north of Hunter would have joined New England. Ultimately however, the Commission opted for a less radical proposal that saw Charlton abolished, Hunter pushed eastward to absorb most of Charlton's territory, and New England absorbing a few small areas in Hunter's north. Due to changing populations, overall New South Wales lost a seat while Western Australia gained a seat.

Members

Election results

References

External links
 Division of New England - Australian Electoral Commission

Electoral divisions of Australia
Constituencies established in 1901
1901 establishments in Australia
New England (New South Wales)